Hans Haslum (8 November 1789 –  5 July 1875) was a Norwegian farmer and elected official. He served as a representative at the Norwegian Constitutional Assembly.

Hans Johnsen Haslum was born in Haslum at Bærum in Akershus, Norway. He was raised on a family farm and was educated at home by a tutor.  As a young man, he chose a military career. He became a corporal in 1805. In 1814, he was serving as a sergeant  in the Artillery Corps. In 1816, Haslum was discharged from military service.

Hans Johnsen Haslum  represented the Artillery Corps (Artilleri-Corpsetat) the Norwegian Constituent Assembly in 1814, together with Peter Motzfeldt. Both representatives supported the independence party (Selvstendighetspartiet). During the Swedish-Norwegian War in 1814 he participated in the Battle of Kjølberg Bridge. 

In 1816, he married Anne Christine Norderaas (1791-1834) with whom he had seven children. When they married, the couple took over her family farm (Norderaas i Ås) in Follo. He was also acting sheriff of the district and from 1838-1841 he was the first mayor of Ås. In 1857, Haslum  became the first director of the Eidsvoll Building (Eidsvollsbygningen) at Eidsvoll.

References

External links
Representantene på Eidsvoll 1814 (Cappelen Damm AS)
 Men of Eidsvoll (eidsvollsmenn)

Related Reading
Holme Jørn (2014) De kom fra alle kanter - Eidsvollsmennene og deres hus  (Oslo: Cappelen Damm) 

1789 births
1875 deaths
Bærum politicians
Norwegian farmers
Norwegian Army personnel
Norwegian military personnel of the Napoleonic Wars
Fathers of the Constitution of Norway
Mayors of places in Akershus